Divišov is a market town in Benešov District in the Central Bohemian Region of the Czech Republic. It has about 1,700 inhabitants. It lies near the rivers Sázava and Blanice,

Administrative parts
Villages of Dalovy, Křešice, Lbosín, Měchnov, Radonice, Šternov and Zdebuzeves are administrative parts of Divišov. Radonice and Zdebuzeves form an exclave of the municipal territory.

Geography
It is located in a hilly landscape. The western part of the municipal territory lies in the Benešov Uplands and the eastern part in the Vlašim Uplands. Large part of the area is covered with forests.

The confluence of the rivers Sázava and Blanice is located in Radonice part of Divišov.

History
The first written mention of Divišov is from 1130. The settlement was probably founded during reign of Bretislav I (1034–1055) by a member of Bretislav's retinue named Diviš. On the site of today's dean's building, there was a keep around which a settlement began to form. Before 1242, Zdislav, the first-born son of Diviš of Divišov, founded Český Šternberk Castle in the neighbourhood of today's Divišov municipal territory, and the house of Divišov became the house of Sternberg.

In 1545, Divišov became a town. It received coat of arms with a gold star which reminded the lords of Sternberg.

In 1742, after a large fire, almost the whole of Divišov burned down.

In the 19th and 20th centuries, development of industry occurred. In 1899, the construction of the railway line leading from Čerčany to Kolín was started. The construction of D1 motorway linking Prague to Wien has been completed in 1977.

After Divišov lost its town status around 1960, it became a market town in 2006.

Jewish population
The first Jews allegedly settled in Divišov before 1685. The first mention of the presence of the Jewish population is from 1718. The Jewish community was established on 1 August 1776, and immediately after its establishment, it applied for the lease of land for the establishment of a cemetery, which was founded in 1777. The cemetery was used until World War II.

Demographics

Economy

At the end of the 19th century, a factory for the production and processing of velvet was established here, and its products was appreciated even abroad. In 1948, Jaroslav Simandl founded a factory for speedway motorcycles of the Jawa brand.

Divišov is an industrial centre: beside Jawa, there is a transport company, a heavy machinery factory and an electronic equipment plant. Divišov also became known as a fish farming area.

Transport
The D1 motorway passes through the northern part of the territory.

Sport
There is a speedway stadium in Divišov. It was opened in 1955. It hosts large international races every year.

Sights

The synagogue was built at the beginning of the 19th century. In 1854–1856, it was rebuilt to the Neoclassical style. After the building was used as a warehouse and hairdressing salon during the 20th century, it was returned to Jewish community of Prague in 1995. Since 2004, it serves as the Museum of the Life of the Jewish Community of Divišov.

The Jewish cemetery has an area of 2,921 square meters and 200 tombstones of the Baroque and Neoclassical type have been preserved, the oldest legible from the end of the 18th century. It is protected as a national cultural heritage and is gradually renovated.

References

External links

Chopos Municipal Association

Populated places in Benešov District
Market towns in the Czech Republic